Events from the year 1942 in Romania. The year was dominated by the Second World War.

Incumbents
King: Michael I of Romania.
Prime Minister: Ion Antonescu.

Events
 6 June – A state of war is declared between Romania and the United States.
 1 July – Romanian and German troops capture the fortress at Sevastopol following a siege that had lasted 8 months.
 7 September – Romanian and German troops capture Novorossiysk in the Battle of the Caucasus.
 2 November – Soldiers of the Vânători de munte under the command of general Ioan Dumitrache capture Nalchik, the farthest advance by the Axis powers into the Caucasus.
 19 November – The Romania Third and Fourth Armies come under attack by the Soviet Red Army at the Battle of Stalingrad.
 1 December – The Soviet cruiser  and destroyer  shell Snake Island, damaging the radio station, barracks and lighthouse on the island, but fail to inflict significant losses.

Births
 5 January – Alexandru Ioan Lupaș, mathematician (died 2007).
 9 March – Ion Caramitru, stage and film actor, stage director, and political figure (died 2021).
 25 March – Otilia Valeria Coman (pen name Ana Blandiana), poet.
 25 March – Basarab Nicolescu, theoretical physicist.
 27 March – Olga Bucătaru, film and stage actress (died 2020).
 2 April – Gabriela Adameșteanu, novelist, short story writer, essayist, journalist, and translator.
 23 May – Gabriel Liiceanu, philosopher.
 28 May – Păun Otiman, agronomist, politician, member of the Romanian Academy.
 22 September – Alexandru Moisuc, agricultural scientist.
 4 November – Edward Luttwak, American military strategist and author.

Deaths
 21 March – Olha Kobylianska, modernist writer and feminist (born 1863).
 21 November – Alexandru Pastia, colonel, killed in action at the Battle of Stalingrad (born 1893).
 24 November – Ioan Sion, major general, killed in action at the Battle of Stalingrad (born 1890).
 16 December – Selma Meerbaum-Eisinger, poet murdered in the Holocaust (born 1924).

References

Years of the 20th century in Romania
1942 in Romania
Romania
Romania